Richard Brown is a Scottish film and television producer whose credits include True Detective, Catch-22, Outlaw King, and 44 Inch Chest.

Career
Brown started his career as a talent scout for Island Records in London. In 1993, he relocated to the U.S. and transitioned into the film business working at Nick Wechsler, Keith Addis’ Industry Entertainment, and Chris Blackwell's Palm Pictures. During this period Brown produced Directors Label Series with Spike Jonze, Michel Gondry and Chris Cunningham.

From 2006 to 2019, Brown operated under an overall deal with Steve Golin's production company, Anonymous Content—working closely with Golin on the company's expansion into TV. During this time, Brown developed and produced True Detective, Outlaw King, and Catch-22. True Detective received eleven Primetime Emmy nominations heading into the 2014 Emmy season, scooping up five wins. True Detective utilized a "revolutionary" format in which all episodes were written by a single writer, Nic Pizzolatto, and director, Cary Fukunaga. Reviewers cited the show as one of the strongest programs in recent memory, with The Atlantic calling it "the most compelling series currently on television" with "an anthology format that has the potential to help change the way high-end television is produced."

The concept for the Catch-22 originated after the first season of True Detective, when Brown sat down with Luke Davies and David Michôd to discuss possible properties that they would like to adapt in a similar limited series format. Davies brought up Heller's novel, which the trio agreed would benefit from a longer treatment. Davies and Michôd co-wrote the adaptation, which Brown developed at Anonymous. Michôd was originally set to direct until he became unavailable and the producers asked George Clooney to come on board as a director and executive producer. The series earned two Golden Globe Awards nominations, including Best Television Limited Series or Motion Picture Made for Television.

In 2019, Brown launched his own production company, Passenger, and entered into an overall deal with Fremantle. In 2021, Brown executive produced the 6 episode limited series, This England, detailing the United Kingdom’s response to the COVID-19 pandemic. Michael Winterbottom wrote and directed the series, and Kenneth Branagh played  Boris Johnson. The series takes viewers inside the halls of power, as Johnson (Branagh) grapples with Covid-19, Brexit, and a controversial personal and political life. It was released on September 28th, 2022 to wide acclaim across the more than 90 countries in which it was released, as well as being Sky’s most successful original series launch of the year. 

In 2022, Passenger produced a documentary series telling the story of the launch and inaugural season of the NBA's Basketball Africa League, a new Pan African basketball league which is setting out to create an elite sports ecosystem across the African Continent. Brown executive produced, wrote and co-directed (along with South African director Tebogo Malope). Oscar winning filmmaker Ezra Edelman (O.J.: Made In America), Toronto Raptors president Masai Ujiri, and award winning Nigerian filmmaker Akin Omotoso also serve as executive producers on the 4 part series.

In December 2022, Fremantle acquired a majority stake in Passenger. Brown will continue to head up Passenger while also taking on a new  role collaborating with the various production companies and filmmakers within Fremantle's Global Drama group.

Producer filmography
2003-2005: Directors Label
2009: 44 Inch Chest
2013: Breakup at a Wedding
2018: Outlaw King
2014–2019: True Detective
2019: Catch-22

References

External links

Scottish television producers
Scottish film producers
Living people
Year of birth missing (living people)
Place of birth missing (living people)